Tasaka (written: 田坂 or 田阪) is a Japanese surname. Notable people with the surname include:

, Japanese voice actor
, Japanese film director
, Japanese footballer
, Japanese table tennis player
, Japanese film director
, Japanese footballer

See also
6873 Tasaka, a main-belt asteroid

Japanese-language surnames